Lee Sang-woo (born 24 February 1971), is a South Korean film director, screenwriter and actor. His films are sexual, violent and controversial, and are often based on real events.

Personal life 
Lee graduated from University of California, Berkeley, majoring in film.

Career 
Lee has been in the film industry for a long time, most notably as Kim Ki-duk's assistant director, before making the transition to becoming a prolific director in his own right. His official debut was Tropical Manila in 2008.

Filmography

As director 
Mother Is a Whore (2011)
Tropical Manila (2012)
Father Is a Dog (2012)
Barbie (2012)
Novel Meets Movie (segment: "Emergency Exit") (2013)
Fire in Hell (2014)
All About My Father (omnibus film, 2015)
Speed (2015)
Dear Dictator (2015)
I Am Trash (2016) 
Working Street (2016) 
Dirty Romance (2017) 
Bittersweet Brew (2018)
Folklore (episode: "Mongdal") (2018)

As screenwriter 
Mother Is a Whore (2011)
Tropical Manila (2012)
Father Is a Dog (2012)
Barbie (2012)
Fire in Hell (2014)
Speed (2015)
Dear Dictator (2015)
I Am Trash (2016) 
Working Street (2016) 
Dirty Romance (2017) 
Bittersweet Brew (2018)
Folklore (episode: "Mongdal") (2018)

As actor 
Mother Is a Whore (2011)
I Am Trash (2016)

References

External links 
 
 
 

1971 births
Living people
South Korean film directors
South Korean screenwriters